Scoparia dominicki is a moth in the family Crambidae. It was described by Eugene G. Munroe in 1972. It is found in North America, where it has been recorded from Florida, North Carolina, Oklahoma, South Carolina and West Virginia.

Adults are on wing from April to May and in November.

References

Moths described in 1972
Scorparia